Banovci; also known as Šidski Banovci, is a village in eastern Croatia, 7 kilometers away from the Serbian border.
The village is connected with the rest of the country by the D46 state road connecting it with the town of Vinkovci and continuing into Serbia as the State Road 120 to the nearest town of Šid and by the Zagreb–Belgrade railway.

Name 

The village of Banovci was called "Novi Banovci" up until the 1900 and "Šidski Banovci" between 1910 and 1991. The name was formally changed in 1991 by the removal of the first word, yet since the village was part of a self-proclaimed Eastern Slavonia, Baranja and Western Syrmia the old name was officially used in administration up until 1998 and the end of the UNTAES transitional administration, with many local residents continuing to use it up to the present day.

National law on Local elections in Croatia in 1997 by mistake still used the name Šidski Banovci instead of Banovci. The word "Šidski" is a possessive adjective derived from the name of the nearest town of Šid, located 12 kilometers from Banovci in neighboring Serbia.

Similarly named village of Vinkovački Banovci is the name of the old village adjacent to Banovci. Croatian Railways, the national railway company, still uses the name Šidski Banovci for the local Šidski Banovci railway station.  The old name was used by The New York Times in their 2005 investigative report. The 2017 Report on the County Roads published by the Vukovar-Syrmia County in March 2018 still used the previous name Šidski Banovci both on the map and in the textual analysis. The name of the village in Croatian or Serbian is plural.

History

Habsburg Monarchy 
The modern day village was built in the 1730s as a New Banovci next to the old village, modern day Vinkovački Banovci which itself was firstly mentioned in the 15th century. In 1473 the village under the name of Zavrakinci is mentioned to be on the small uplift just northwest of the village where today are located local vineyards. First Serb settlers settled in Banovci during the reign of Charles VI, Holy Roman Emperor. Serb settlers at that time came from modern day Montenegro and from the region around Peć in Kosovo. In 1745 Slavonian Military Frontier was established in the region.

Austria-Hungary 

First Danube Swabians settled in Banovci in 1859. Protestant German settlers relied on the support of local Serbian Orthodox priest Uroš during the first couple of years following their arrival to the new region. Serbian Orthodox priest Uroš believed that Protestant German settlers may help implement reforms with primary interests in reforms in agricultural practices. As the northern part of historical region of Syrmia was predetermined for German Catholic colonists, and settlement in the biggest part of Slavonian Military Frontier was almost impossible, German Protestants had to settle in the bordering region between these two jurisdictions. One of the rare places where it was possible was in Banovci. At the time of German settling local Serbian population exercised its local autonomy through the election of major who hold the honorific title of the prince of the village yet the real spiritual and secular power was in the hands of Orthodox priest. At one time, after the first German colonist family Grumbach arrived to the village, they have offered to their neighbors sausages produced on German recipe. Soon the drunken young men from the village began to come to the Grumbach's household demanding to be given those sausages as well as they were considered to be much better than those produced by local Serbian recipe. After the same incident repeated for several times German colonists asked priest Uroš for help. When the priest once caught the young men at the Grumbach's household he chased them and banned them from doing the same thing again. He also required each one of them to bring one pig to the Grumbach's household as a compensation. Latter on, as there was no Lutheran church in Banovci, German Protestant settlers asked priest Uroš to hold a Christmas liturgy for them under the Eastern Eastern liturgical rite. Priest Uroš have refused this request as it was contrary to Orthodox canonical rules, yet he offered them to organize Christmas Celebration on their own in the St. Petka orthodox church in the village. He also attended their celebration which impressed him but did not lead the prayer.

Kingdom of Yugoslavia 
Within the Kingdom of Yugoslavia Banovci were administratively part of Šid Srez firstly within the pre-Yugoslav the Syrmia County (up to 1922),  the Syrmia Oblast (1922–1929), after that the Danube Banovina (1929–1939) and ultimately the Banovina of Croatia (1939-1941).

World War II 
During the World War II survivors of the Ivanci massacre settled in Banovci. On 15 June 1943 German Volke Group in the Independent State of Croatia reported on morale drop due to Yugoslav Partisans activities and that Friedrich Hoffman took over the leadership of their local group in Šidski Banovci from Karl Lahm.

Banovci itself was a center of Yugoslav Partisans in Syrmia targeted primarily on sabotage of Nazi and quisling transport along the Zagreb–Belgrade railway. On 8 October 1943 the Sabotage Group of the Second Syrmia NOP detachment mined the Zagreb–Belgrade railway and destroyed a locomotive and 6 freight wagons. On the following day, the Ustasha police hanged 20 hostages from Šid as revenge for sabotage. The railway was mined again on 19 October 1943 when a locomotive and 4 wagons of a German express train were destroyed. The third sabotage of the railway took place on 2 December 1943 when a German military freight train with war material was mined and destroyed including locomotive and 8 wagons.

People's Hero of Yugoslavia Slobodan Bajić Paja was from Šidski Banovci by origin.

Post-War establishment of the border between Yugoslav Republics of Serbia and Croatia 

Some minor border demarcation issues between the Autonomous Province of Vojvodina, a part of the Socialist Republic of Serbia, and Socialist Republic of Croatia (both part of the FPR Yugoslavia) were left unresolved by the Anti-Fascist Council for the National Liberation of Yugoslavia by the 24 February 1945 and the end of the war. In order to settle the matter, in June of 1945 the federal authorities set up a five-member commission presided over by Milovan Đilas.

District of Šid was identified as one of the points of territorial dispute. Commission concluded that District of Šid, including the village of Banovci at the time, shall become a part of the Autonomous Province of Vojvodina. Commission's demarcation was nevertheless subsequently altered changed in several instances including in the case of District of Šid where villages Tovarnik, Ilača and Banovci were ultimately transferred to the Socialist Republic of Croatia. Both Ilača and Tovarnik were larger, ethnically Croat villages, while Banovci as a smaller Serb village which until recently had German majority was transferred to Croatia in order to ensure territorial contiguity.

Yugoslav Communist authorities claimed that local self-determination referendums took place on which population decided to become join Croatian federal unit. In 2015 article in right wing conservative Nova srpska politička misao quarterly magazine, Igor Marković claimed that there is no any evidence that any such local referendum ever took place in Banovci and other villages and argued that based on that Serbia shall request return of those settlements or on reciprocal right of self-determination for Serb settlements in Eastern Slavonia. Territory of the District of Šid was changed a couple of times in the mid 1940s including changes within the Province of Vojvodina with most of them having minimal daily consequences during the existence of Yugoslav state.

Socialist Republic of Croatia

Croatian War of Independence and United Nations Mission 
On 7 January 1991 Serb National Council of Eastern Slavonia, Baranja and Western Syrmia was established in Banovci subsequently leading to the establishment of the self-proclaimed SAO Eastern Slavonia, Baranja and Western Syrmia in the same year. During the War Banovci were part of the self-proclaimed entity. Between 1995 and 1998 Banovci were part of the temporary United Nations governed protectorate aimed at its peaceful reintegration under the rule of the Republic of Croatia. Within the unrecognized Republic of Serbian Krajina Banovci was a de facto part of parallel Mirkovci Municipality which was established on the part of pre-War Yugoslav Vinkovci Municipality under the rebel control.

Post-1998 History 
In 1998 in addition to de jure Banovci became de facto part of Nijemci Municipality and Vukovar-Syrmia County. Banovci is settlement within the Areas of Special State Concern belonging to the first among the three groups. In 1998 in addition to de jure Banovci became de facto part of Nijemci Municipality and Vukovar-Syrmia County. Banovci is settlement within the Areas of Special State Concern belonging to the first among the three groups. In 2005 village was shortly in the spotlight of international media when The New York Times discovered it to be a location of hiding of Slobodan Davidović, a former member of Scorpions paramilitary accused and subsequently convicted on 15 years in prison for war crimes related to Srebrenica genocide in Bosnia and Herzegovina. While Serbian police described him as being in hiding The New York Times discovered that he "has been here on and off since the end of war, staying with his elderly mother and brother in a small house off the village high street". In 2012 non-governmental organization "Ivanci" was established in the village aimed at reconstruction of the monument in the memorial area, collection of materials for the publication of a monograph and organization of commemorations for victims of Ivanci massacre. In early 2019 villages of Tovarnik, Ilača and Banovci organized joint demonstrations against truck drivers from countries other than Croatia and Serbia which are causing heavy traffic congestion on the D46 road while waiting to cross the state border between Croatia and Serbia. Citizens requested redirection of all truck transportation, with the exception of Croatian and Serbian trucks traveling to one or the other state, to be removed from the D46 road and redirected to A3 motorway. Later in 2019 village celebrated 200 years of the local orthodox church and 800 years of autocephaly of the Serbian Orthodox Church.

Languages 
Due to the fact that Serbs of Croatia constitute majority population in the village, the Nijemci Municipality allows the equal official use not only of Croatian language, but the Serbian language and Serbian Cyrillic alphabet as well.

Demographic
The village is home to over 400 inhabitants most of whom have declare themselves Orthodox Christians and Serbs.

Major source of income is agriculture or work in nearby towns of Vukovar, Vinkovci and Šid. Population is faced with high unemployment rates, aging population and emigration of young and educated individuals.

Slobodan Bajić Paja, a People's Hero of Yugoslavia, was born in Banovci and is best known for his participation in the resistance that fought against the Nazi forces in World War II.

German community

Before the World War II Banovci was mostly inhabited by the Protestant Danube Swabians who firstly settled in the existing Serb village in the 1740s. According to the census of 1910, Banovci had 990 residents, 668 of whom were Germans. They had developed a social life and a multitude of public institutions. The most important was the local Protestant church. Next door to the church was the school, which served as the town hall as well, and a local saving bank was nearby. Local residents cherished traditional values; it was a village that maintained a strong work ethic. In late 1944 villagers had just barely escaped from Banovci. This was similar to that experienced by thousands of other ethnic Germans in the latter stages of World War II. The new post-war government declared that ethnic Germans in Yugoslavia were no longer its citizens and confiscated their property. By 1945, nearly 500,000 Germans had been expelled—the term that would be used in Article XIII of the Potsdam Agreement was "transfer" from Yugoslavian territory. The residents of Banovci had some advance warning from the Nazi German Army that they would have to leave their homes and evacuate the village. On October 17, with the Banovci church-bells pealing, a caravan of 40 to 50 families left the village for Austria and Germany. They headed northwest over Hungary.

Religion

Serbian Orthodoxy

The neoclassical St. Petka's Church was completed in 1819. The church and its parish are under jurisdiction of Eparchy of Srem which is based in Sremski Karlovci in neighbouring Serbia. The church is dedicated to Saint Parascheva of the Balkans.

Pentecostalism
First Pentecostal activities in Banovci started in 1920. For beginning of activities of this religious group is connected story about miracle cures of local girl Elizabeth Spies.

Calvinism

Evangelical Lutheranism

Culture
Every year on the Orthodox Christmas Eve (January 6), residents in the churchyard have a bonfire for "Badnjak", the Serbian word for Christmas Eve. In this occasion locals take oak trees from the area and make a ritual fire. These nights the locals remember their old Slavic religion and symbolically confirm Christianity.

In the rest of the year, villagers are organized around the celebration of New Year's, Women's Day, labor day, the occasion of the end of the school year, important religious holidays, etc.
The football club, pensioners club, the Protestant community and the Women's Caucus, which also periodically organizes public events, are active participants.

Education

Elementary School Ilača-Banovci is an elementary school situated in Ilača, Banovci and Vinkovački Banovci. Classes are taught in Croatian and Serbian.

The Banovci School used to host the center of the school administration, before it was moved to Ilača in 2002. Classes in Banovci are conducted in the Serbian version of the Serbo-Croatian language. The school is located in the center of Banovci. The school contains a small gym, garden and football field.

In addition to classes at the other two schools, students in Banovci must also take Serbian Language, Orthodox Religion Education, History of Serbia, Geography of Serbia and Arts and Music of Serbia.

The school organizes several annual celebrations that involve the entire local community (at the start of school year, Bread day, Sport day, St. Sava, and at the end of school year).

Sport
NK Borac is a football club based in the Banovci. The club was founded in 1940 by a group of local football fans. The name of the club means "Fighter", referring to local soldiers from the World War II. The club owns the local playground in Banovci. The club regularly achieves good results in the 3 County League and is usually among the top three clubs. NK Borac is funded by donations from local community, the municipality and local businesses. Borac footballers are volunteers and do not receive financial compensation.

In addition to their regular activities, NK Borac Banovci has developed a collaboration with local schools with the project Sport Day. The Sport Day is an event that is held every spring. The students are released from classes to be on the Borac court competing in various sports activities such as football, racing and old sports. To further engage youth and initiate them into the mad football rage of Europe, Borac also launched the youth football club.

See also
St. Petka's Church, Banovci
Evangelical Reformed Church in Šidski Banovci

Notable natives and residents
Slobodan Bajić Paja
 (President of the Berlin-Brandenburg Academy of Sciences and Humanities 2006-2015, Union of the German Academies of Sciences and Humanities 2008-2015 and the All European Academies since 2012)
Milorad Kosanović

Notes

References

External links

 Information on the Nijemci Municipality Website
 Local elementary school
 Image of two female Yugoslav Partisans (Jelena Milošević and Rada Kovačević) in Banovci in December 1944, Museum of the Revolution of Yugoslav Peoples, exhibit number 14015

Populated places in Vukovar-Syrmia County
History of the Serbs of Croatia
Populated places in Syrmia
Serb communities in Croatia